Mizutani is a Japanese surname. Notable people with the surname include:

, stage name , Japanese kickboxer
, table tennis player
, military personnel of World War II 
, adult film actress
, football player
, Japanese sport wrestler
, Japanese singer, member of Bon-Bon Blanco
, Japanese footballer 
, Japanese actress
, football player
, voice actress
, actor and singer

See also
 8947 Mizutani, a main-belt asteroid

Japanese-language surnames